Habarakada (හබරකඩ) is a small town in Sri Lanka. It is located within  Western Province, Sri Lanka .

See also
List of towns in Southern Province, Sri Lanka
Another village with same name Habarakada is in the  Homagama electorate, Colombo District, Western province, Sri Lanka
There is a village called Habarakada in Homagama in the Colombo District.
https://www.google.lk/maps/place/Habarakada/@6.8653287,80.0090396,16z/data=!3m1!4b1!4m5!3m4!1s0x3ae253d6bb34dbdf:0x8ee0bdae6c6fc328!8m2!3d6.8659652!4d80.0129664

External links

Populated places in Southern Province, Sri Lanka